Rhabdopleurida is one of three orders in the class Pterobranchia, which are small, worm-shaped animals, are the only surviving graptolites. Members belong to the hemichordates. Species in this order are sessile, colonial, connected with a stolon, living in clear water and secrete tubes called tubarium. They have a single gonad, the gill slits are absent and the collar has two tentaculated arms. Rhabdopleura is the best studied pterobranch in developmental biology.  Rhabdopleura is the only extant 
graptolite.

Taxonomy
This small order is monotypic. It has only a single extant genus, containing four to six living species.
 
Order Rhabdopleurida Fowler 1892
 Family Rhabdopleuridae Harmer 1905
 Genus Rhabdopleura Allman 1869
 Rhabdopleura annulata Norman 1921 — Indo-Pacific region
 Rhabdopleura compacta Hincks 1880 — Atlantic
 Rhabdopleura normani Allmann, 1869 — Atlantic and parts of the Pacific
 Rhabdopleura recondita Beli, Cameron and Piraino, 2018 — Mediterranean
 Rhabdopleura striata Schepotieff 1909 — Pacific (Sri Lanka)

Nomen dubium:
 Rhabdopleura grimaldi  Julien 1890 nomen dubium
 Rhabdopleura manubialis Jullien & Calvet 1903 nomen dubium

Extinct species:
 †Rhabdopleura delmari Mortelmans 1955
 †Rhabdopleura graysoni Chapman, Durman & Rickards 1995
 †Rhabdopleura hollandi Rickards, Chapman & Temple 1984
 †Rhabdopleura kozlowskii Kulicki 1969
 †Rhabdopleura obuti Durman & Sennikov 1993
 †Rhabdopleura sinica Chapman, Durman & Rickards 1995
 †Rhabdopleura vistulae Kozlowski 1956

References

 Marinespecies.org
 ITIS.gov
 Hayward, P.J.; Ryland, J.S. (Ed.) (1990). The marine fauna of the British Isles and North-West Europe: 1. Introduction and protozoans to arthropods. Clarendon Press: Oxford, UK. . 627 pp.
 

 

 
Hemichordates
Deuterostome orders